The 2006 Texas Legislature election was held on Tuesday, November 7, 2006, in the U.S. state of Texas. The Texas Legislature election was conducted as a part of the 2006 Texas general election, which also included the 2006 United States Senate election in Texas, the 2006 United States House of Representatives elections in Texas, and the 2006 Texas gubernatorial election.

Successful candidates served in the Eightieth Texas Legislature, which convened on January 9, 2007, at the capitol in Austin.

Texas Senate
Fifteen of the sixteen elections for the Texas Senate were contested to some extent. In the District 3 race, Robert Nichols won his Republican primary and was unopposed in the fall election.

Five Senators chose to not run or were defeated in the primaries.

Senate race statewide summary

Senate race summary by district

Senate race details 
District 1

District 2

District 3

Race uncontested after Nichols’ win in the Republican primary.

District 5

District 7

District 8

District 12

District 13

District 14

District 15

District 17

District 18

Incumbent Democratic Senator Ken Armbrister did not run for re-election. No other Democrat ran to replace him, allowing Republican Glen Hegar to easily win the race, flipping the seat.

District 19

Incumbent Frank Madla was ousted by Uresti in contentious Democratic primary race. Madla was the only incumbent senator to lose a primary race in 2006.

District 22

District 25

District 29

This was considered by some to be an extremely important Texas Senate election race. Thought to potentially add to the competitiveness of this Senate race was District 29's historically low-voter turnout and Republican "Dee" Margo's close connections to President George W. Bush via First Lady Laura Bush's close friendship to "Dee" Margo's spouse, El Pasoan Adair Margo. As it turned out, Shapleigh won reelection in a race that was not that close.

House of Representatives

In the Texas House of Representatives, 117 of the 150 seats were contested in the November 2006 election. Thirty-two races were uncontested after the primary elections on March 7, 2006, while the remaining two were determined in the primary runoffs on April 11. One previously uncontested race came back into play with the withdrawal of the incumbent, thus allowing a new nomination process by both major parties.

21 new members were elected to the House of Representatives. Seven incumbents were defeated in the primaries, six ran for higher office, seven either retired or withdrew after the primaries, one died after winning the primary, and five lost in the general election.

Special Elections 
District 48: A special election was held on January 7, 2006 to fill the unexpired term of Rep. Todd Baxter, who resigned on November 1, 2005. Democrat Donna Howard received 49.46% in the special election, narrowly missing the 50% mark needed to win outright, so she faced Republican Ben Bentzin in the runoff on February 14, 2006. Howard won the runoff with 57.62%, flipping the district.

House race summary, Districts 1–25

|}

House race summary, Districts 26–50
 District 33
 Incumbent Vilma Luna was unopposed in Democratic primary and was to be unopposed in the fall, but she withdrew from the race, allowing the Democratic Party a new nomination process and giving the Republican Party the chance to make its own nomination.

District 48
 Ben Bentzin, unopposed in the Republican primary, withdrew from the race for House District 48 on August 21, 2006. Under the Texas Election Code, when a party nominee withdraws from a contested race, the party does not have the option to replace the candidate unless the candidate has been declared ineligible.

|}

House race summary, Districts 51–75

House race summary, Districts 76–100

House race summary, Districts 101–125

House race summary, Districts 126–150

See also
 2006 United States elections
 2006 United States Senate elections
 2006 United States House of Representatives elections
 2006 United States gubernatorial elections

References

External links

Legislature
Texas Legislature elections
Texas Legislature